The Star (season 11) was the eleventh season of The Star, a singing competition produced by Exact, a GMM Grammy Company.  Preliminary auditions took place during November to December, and broadcast on One HD, began on 17 January 2015.  The season concluded on 26 April 2015

Preliminary auditions

Contestants
Order of competition numbers

Eliminated Chart

  Male
  Female

  Green number indicate the 100 vote in studio highest score for each week.
 Red number indicate the 100 vote in studio lowest score for each week.
  indicates the Contestants eliminated that week.
  indicates the returning Contestants  that finished in the bottom two.
  indicates the winner of the competition.
  indicates the runner-up of the competition.

Call-out order

Red number indicate the 100 vote in studio lowest score for each week.
 Green number indicate the 100 vote in studio highest score for each week.
 The contestant was eliminated
  indicates the winner of the competition.
  indicates the runner-up of the competition.

References

External links
 Official Website

The Star (TV series)
2015 Thai television seasons